These are the 107 municipalities of the canton of Solothurn, Switzerland.

List 

Aedermannsdorf
Aeschi (SO)
Balm bei Günsberg
Balsthal
Bärschwil
Bättwil
Beinwil (SO)
Bellach
Bettlach
Biberist
Biezwil
Bolken
Boningen
Breitenbach
Buchegg
Büren (SO)
Büsserach
Däniken
Deitingen
Derendingen
Dornach
Drei Höfe
Dulliken
Egerkingen
Eppenberg-Wöschnau
Erlinsbach (SO)
Erschwil
Etziken
Fehren
Feldbrunnen-St. Niklaus
Flumenthal
Fulenbach
Gempen
Gerlafingen
Grenchen
Gretzenbach
Grindel
Günsberg
Gunzgen
Hägendorf
Halten
Härkingen
Hauenstein-Ifenthal
Herbetswil
Himmelried
Hochwald
Hofstetten-Flüh
Holderbank (SO)
Horriwil
Hubersdorf
Hüniken
Kammersrohr
Kappel (SO)
Kestenholz
Kienberg
Kleinlützel
Kriegstetten
Langendorf
Laupersdorf
Lohn-Ammannsegg
Lommiswil
Lostorf
Lüsslingen-Nennigkofen
Luterbach
Lüterkofen-Ichertswil
Lüterswil-Gächliwil
Matzendorf
Meltingen
Messen
Metzerlen-Mariastein
Mümliswil-Ramiswil
Neuendorf
Niederbuchsiten
Niedergösgen
Nuglar-St. Pantaleon
Nunningen
Oberbuchsiten
Oberdorf (SO)
Obergerlafingen
Obergösgen
Oekingen
Oensingen
Olten
Recherswil
Rickenbach (SO)
Riedholz
Rodersdorf
Rüttenen
Schnottwil
Schönenwerd
Seewen
Selzach
Solothurn
Starrkirch-Wil
Stüsslingen
Subingen
Trimbach
Unterramsern
Walterswil (SO)
Wangen bei Olten
Welschenrohr-Gänsbrunnen
Winznau
Wisen (SO)
Witterswil
Wolfwil
Zuchwil
Zullwil

References

 
Subdivisions of the canton of Solothurn
Solothurn